Margaret MacDonald was born in 1815 in Port Glasgow, Scotland and died around 1840. She lived with her two older brothers, James and George, both of whom ran a shipping business. Beginning in 1826 and through 1829, a few preachers in Scotland emphasized that the world's problems could only be addressed through an outbreak of supernatural gifts from the Holy Spirit. In response, Isabella and Mary Campbell of the parish of Rosneath manifested charismatic experiences such as speaking in tongues. Around 1830, miraculous healings were reported through James Campbell, first of his sister Margaret MacDonald and then of Mary Campbell (through James's letter to Mary). Shortly thereafter, James and George MacDonald manifested the speaking and interpretations of tongues, and soon others followed suit in prayer meetings. These charismatic experiences garnered major national attention. Many came to see and investigate these events. Some, such as Edward Irving and Henry Drummond, regarded these events as genuine displays from the Holy Spirit. Others, including John Nelson Darby and Benjamin Wills Newton, whom the Plymouth Brethren sent on their behalf to investigate, came to the conclusion that these displays were demonic.

Origin of the dispensational pretribulation rapture
There have been a couple of attempts to locate a "source" for Darby's concept of the rapture – the belief that a core of Christian believers who have died will be raised from the dead, and believers who are still alive and remain shall be "caught up together with them in the clouds to meet the Lord in the air" in conjunction with the Second Coming of Jesus Christ. Some of these attempts imply that Darby's concepts originated from a "false" source. Samuel Prideaux Tregelles alleged that The concept was taken from one of the charismatic utterances in Edward Irving's church. Since Tregelles regarded the utterances as "pretending to be from God," his implication is that Darby's rapture is from a demonic source. Dave MacPherson built upon Tregelles's accusation, and argued that the source for Darby's rapture was from an Margaret MacDonald's 1830 vision of the end times.

However, scholars think there are major obstacles that render these accusations untenable. It is clear that Darby regarded the 1830 charismatic manifestations as demonic and not of God. Darby would not have borrowed an idea from a source that he clearly thought was demonic. Also Darby had already written out his pretribulation rapture views in January 1827, 3 years prior to the 1830 events and any MacDonald utterance. When MacDonald's utterance is read closely, her statements appear to present a posttribulationist scenario ("being the fiery trial which is to try us" and "for the purging and purifying of the real members of the body of Jesus"). Confusion on this point was enhanced because while MacDonald's vision as first published in 1840 describes a post-tribulation view of the rapture, a version published in 1861 lacked two important passages that appear to present a post-tribulation view: "This is the fiery trial which is to try us. - It will be for the purging and purifying of the real members of the body of Jesus" and "The trial of the Church is from Antichrist. It is by being filled with the Spirit that we shall be kept". For these and other reasons, dispensational scholars consider MacPherson's alleged connection to dispensationalism as untenable.

MacDonald's utterance
The first account of MacDonald's utterance was published in 1840 in Norton's Memoirs pp. 171–76, and the second account in 1861 in The Restoration of Apostles and Prophets pp. 15–18. The two accounts were conflated by MacPherson in his book The Incredible Cover-up pp. 151–54. The bold text below is from the first account:

"It was first the awful state of the land that was pressed upon me. I saw the blindness and infatuation of the people to be very great. I felt the cry of Liberty just to be the hiss of the serpent, to drown them in perdition. It was just 'no God.' I repeated the words, Now there is distress of nations, with perplexity, the seas and the waves roaring, men's hearts failing them for fear. Now look out for the sign of the Son of Man. Here I was made to stop and cry out, O it is not known what the sign of the Son of Man is; the people of God think they are waiting, but they know not what it is. I felt this needed to be revealed, and that there was great darkness and error about it; but suddenly what it was burst upon me with a glorious light. I saw it was just the Lord himself descending from Heaven with a shout, just the glorified man, even Jesus; but that all must, as Stephen was, be filled with the Holy Ghost, that they might look up, and see the brightness of the Father's glory. I saw the error to be, that men think that it will be something seen by the natural eye; but 'tis spiritual discernment that is needed, the eye of God in his people. Many passages were revealed, in a light in which I had not before seen them. I repeated, 'Now is the kingdom of Heaven like unto ten virgins, who went forth to meet the Bridegroom, five wise and five foolish; they that were foolish took their lamps, but took no oil with them; but they that were wise took oil in their vessels with their lamps.' 'But be ye not unwise, but understanding what the will of the Lord is; and be not drunk with wine wherein is excess, but be filled with the Spirit.' This was the oil the wise virgins took in their vessels – this is the light to be kept burning – the light of God – that we may discern that which cometh not with observation to the natural eye. Only those who have the light of God within them will see the sign of his appearance. No need to follow them who say, see here, or see there, for his day shall be as the lightning to those in whom the living Christ is.  'Tis Christ in us that will lift us up – he is the light – 'tis only those that are alive in him that will be caught up to meet him in the air. I saw that we must be in the Spirit, that we might see spiritual things. John was in the Spirit, when he saw a throne set in Heaven. But I saw that the glory of the ministration of the Spirit had not been known. I repeated frequently, but the spiritual temple must and shall be reared, and the fullness of Christ be poured into his body, and then shall we be caught up to meet him. Oh none will be counted worthy of this calling but his body, which is the church, and which must be a candlestick all of gold. I often said, Oh the glorious inbreaking of God which is now about to burst on this earth; Oh the glorious temple which is now about to be reared, the bride adorned for her husband; and Oh what a holy, holy bride she must be, to be prepared for such a glorious bridegroom. I said, Now shall the people of God have to do with realities  – now shall the glorious mystery of God in our nature be known – now shall it be known what it is for man to be glorified. I felt that the revelation of Jesus Christ had yet to be opened up – it is not knowledge about God that it contains, but it is an entering into God – I saw that there was a glorious breaking in of God to be. I felt as Elijah, surrounded with chariots of fire. I saw as it were, the spiritual temple reared, and the Head Stone brought forth with shoutings of grace, grace, unto it. It was a glorious light above the brightness of the sun that shone round about me. I felt that those who were filled with the Spirit could see spiritual things, and feel walking in the midst of them, while those who had not the Spirit could see nothing – so that two shall be in one bed, the one taken and the other left, because the one has the light of God within while the other cannot see the Kingdom of Heaven. I saw the people of God in an awfully dangerous situation, surrounded by nets and entanglements, about to be tried, and many about to be deceived and fall. Now will THE WICKED be revealed, with all power and signs and lying wonders, so that if it were possible the very elect will be deceived – This is the fiery trial which is to try us. – It will be for the purging and purifying of the real members of the body of Jesus; but Oh it will be a fiery trial. Every soul will be shaken to the very centre. The enemy will try to shake in every thing we have believed – but the trial of real faith will be found to honour and praise and glory. Nothing but what is of God will stand. The stony-ground hearers will be made manifest – the love of many will wax cold.''

I frequently said that night, and often since, now shall the awful sight of a false Christ be seen on this earth, and nothing but the living Christ in us can detect this awful attempt of the enemy to deceive – for it is with all deceivableness of unrighteousness he will work – he will have a counterpart for every part of God's truth, and an imitation for every work of the Spirit. The Spirit must and will be poured out on the church, that she may be purified and filled with God – and just in proportion as the Spirit of God works, so will he – when our Lord anoints men with power, so will he. This is particularly the nature of the trial, through which those are to pass who will be counted worthy to stand before the Son of man. There will be outward trial too, but 'tis principally temptation. It is brought on by the outpouring of the Spirit, and will just increase in proportion as the Spirit is poured out. The trial of the Church is from Antichrist. It is by being filled with the Spirit that we shall be kept. I frequently said, Oh be filled with the Spirit – have the light of God in you, that you may detect Satan – be full of eyes within -be clay in the hands of the potter -submit to be filled, filled with God. This will build the temple. It is not by might nor by power, but by my Spirit, saith the Lord. This will fit us to enter into the marriage supper of the Lamb. I saw it to be the will of God that all should be filled. But what hindered the real life of God from being received by his people, was their turning from Jesus, who is the way to the Father. They were not entering in by the door. For he is faithful who hath said, by me if any man enters in he shall find pasture. They were bypassing the cross, through which every drop of the Spirit of God flows to us. All power that comes not through the blood of Christ is not of God.

When I say, they are looking from the cross, I feel that there is much in it – they turn from the blood of the Lamb, by which we overcome, and in which our robes are washed and made white. There are low views of God's holiness, and a ceasing to condemn sin in the flesh, and a looking from him who humbled himself, and made himself of no reputation. Oh! it is needed, much needed at present, a leading back to the cross. I saw that night, and often since, that there will be an outpouring of the Spirit on the body, such as has not been, a baptism of fire, that all the dross may be put away. Oh there must and will be such an indwelling of the living God as has not been – the servants of God sealed in their foreheads – great conformity to Jesus – his holy image seen in his people – just the bride made comely by his comeliness put upon her. This is what we are at present made to pray much for, that speedily we may all be made ready to meet our Lord in the air – and it will be. Jesus wants his bride. His desire is toward us. He that shall come, will come, and will not tarry. Amen and Amen Even so come Lord Jesus."

See also
 Catholic Apostolic Church
 Dispensationalism
 Edward Irving
 Rapture
 John Nelson Darby

References

1815 births
1840s deaths
19th-century apocalypticists
Christian apocalyptic writings
English Charismatics
People from Port Glasgow
Year of death uncertain